

References

  (D-histidine)
  (L-histidine)
  (D-histidine)
  (L-histidine)

Chemical data pages
Chemical data pages cleanup